Red Mill Burgers is an American restaurant in Seattle, Washington with locations in the Phinney Ridge, Interbay and Ballard neighborhoods.  The first Red Mill opened in the Capitol Hill neighborhood in 1937, but eventually closed down in 1967. It reopened with the new owners in Phinney Ridge in 1994 and Interbay in 1998. A third location opened in Ballard near the Ballard Locks in late 2011.

Red Mill remains one of the most popular burger restaurants in Seattle, winning praise in the Seattle Weekly'''s Best of Seattle for ten years in a row. It was mentioned in GQ magazine and The Oprah Winfrey Show.Oprah's best burgers The restaurant was spotlighted in a February 2009 episode of Man v. Food''.

In 2016, owner John Shepherd faced widespread criticism over allegedly sexist and transphobic Facebook posts. He stepped down from his position indefinitely.

References

External links
 

Restaurants established in 1937
Hamburger restaurants
Regional restaurant chains in the United States
Restaurants in Seattle
1937 establishments in Washington (state)